The 1987 Illinois Fighting Illini football team was an American football team that represented the University of Illinois at Urbana-Champaign during the 1987 NCAA Division I-A football season. In their eighth and final year under head coach Mike White, the Illini compiled a 3–7–1 record and finished in eighth place in the Big Ten Conference.

The team's offensive leaders were quarterback Scott Mohr with 1,436 passing yards, running back Keith Jones with 322 rushing yards, and Darryl Usher with 723 receiving yards.

Schedule

References

Illinois
Illinois Fighting Illini football seasons
Illinois Fighting Illini football